Simpang Rimba is a district of South Bangka Regency, Bangka-Belitung Islands. It is the fourth largest and third most populated district in the regency, with a population of over 25,000.

References

Populated places in the Bangka Belitung Islands
Districts of South Bangka Regency